Williamsville Water Mill Complex is a historic mill located at Williamsville in Erie County, New York. It was built originally as a sawmill in 1801, substantially enlarged in 1827, and operated in that capacity until 1903. Also on the site was the Water-Lime Works and Williamsville Cement Company mill, which was later converted to be a gristmill.  After 1908, the mills were used for apple cider production.  The complex is a rare surviving example of a water-powered seat of local industry in Western New York.

It was listed on the National Register of Historic Places in 1983.

In 2014, Sweet Jenny's Ice Cream renovated and moved into the mill, where they continue to draw business from those visiting Glen Park.

References

External links

Williamsville Water Mill Complex - U.S. National Register of Historic Places on Waymarking.com
Williamsville Water Mill Final Re-Use Report, March 31, 2009

Industrial buildings and structures on the National Register of Historic Places in New York (state)
Federal architecture in New York (state)
Industrial buildings completed in 1801
Industrial buildings completed in 1827
Buildings and structures in Erie County, New York
National Register of Historic Places in Erie County, New York
1827 establishments in New York (state)
Apple production